Hepatoma-derived growth factor (HDGF) also known as high mobility group protein 1-like 2 (HMG-1L2) is a protein that in humans is encoded by the HDGF gene.

References

Further reading

External links 
 PDBe-KB provides an overview of all the structure information available in the PDB for Human Hepatoma-derived growth factor